Philip Lamantia (October 23, 1927 – March 7, 2005) was an American poet and lecturer. His poems were often visionary, ecstatic, terror-filled, and erotic, exploring the subconscious world of dreams and linking it to daily experiences, while sometimes incorporating typographical arrangements a la concrete poetry. He has posthumously been regarded as "the most visionary poet of the American postwar generation".

Biography
Lamantia was born in San Francisco to Sicilian immigrants, and was raised in the city's Excelsior neighborhood. His poetry was first published in View magazine in 1943, when he was fifteen, and in the final issue of the Surrealist magazine VVV the following year. In 1944 he dropped out of Balboa High School to pursue poetry in New York City.  He returned to the Bay Area in 1945 and his first book, Erotic Poems, was published a year later.

He appeared in Maya Deren's At Land (1944), a 15-minute silent experimental film.

Lamantia was one of the post World War II poets now sometimes referred to as the San Francisco Renaissance, and later became involved with the San Francisco Beat Generation poets and the Surrealist Movement in the United States. He was on the bill at San Francisco's Six Gallery on October 7, 1955, when poet Allen Ginsberg read his poem Howl for the first time. At this event Lamantia chose to read the poems of John Hoffman, a friend who had recently died. Hoffman's poetry collection Journey to the End (which includes the poems that Lamantia read at the Six Gallery) was published by City Lights Bookstore in 2008, bound together with Lamantia's own Tau, a poem-cycle also dating from  the mid-fifties. Tau remained unpublished during Lamantia's lifetime.

Lamantia was also known for his journeys with native peoples in the United States and Mexico in the 1950s, participating in the peyote-eating rituals of the Washo Indians of Nevada which often inspired his poems. In later life, he embraced Catholicism, the religion of his childhood, and wrote many poems on Catholic themes.

Nancy Peters, his wife and literary editor, said of Lamantia, "He found in the narcotic night world a kind of modern counterpart to the Gothic castle -- a zone of peril to be symbolically or existentially crossed."

Works
 Erotic Poems (Berkeley: Bern Porter, 1946)
 Ekstasis (San Francisco: Auerhahn Press, 1959)
 Narcotica (San Francisco: Auerhahn Press, 1959)
 Destroyed Works (San Francisco: Auerhahn Press, 1962)
 Touch of the Marvelous ([no place] Oyez, 1966)
 Selected Poems 1943–1966 (San Francisco: City Lights Books, 1967)
 Charles Bukowski, Harold Norse, Philip Lamantia: Penguin Modern Poets, No. 13. (Harmondsworth: Penguin, 1969)
 Blood of the Air (San Francisco: Four Seasons Foundation, 1970)
 Touch of the Marvelous -- A New Edition (Bolinas: Four Seasons Foundation, 1974)
 Becoming Visible (San Francisco: City Lights Books, 1981)
 Meadowlark West (San Francisco: City Lights Books, 1986)
 Bed of Sphinxes: New and Selected Poems, 1943–1993 (San Francisco: City Lights Books, 1997)
 Tau; with Journey to the End by John Hoffman. Edited by Garrett Caples (San Francisco: City Lights Books, 2008)
 The Collected Poems of Philip Lamantia. Edited with an introduction by Garrett Caples, Andrew Joron, and Nancy Joyce Peters (Berkeley: University of California Press, 2013)
 Preserving Fire. Selected Prose. Edited with an introduction by Garrett Caples (Seattle/New York: Wave Books, 2018)
 Destroyed Works / Zerstörte Werke (German translation and afterword by Marcus Roloff, bilingual Edition. Wenzendorf: Stadtlichter Presse, 2021)

Notes

References
 Nancy Joyce Peters: Philip Lamantia. In: Dictionary of Literary Biography, Vol. 16, 330–336. 
 Steven Frattali: Hypodermic Light: The Poetry of Philip Lamantia and the Question of Surrealism. Peter Lang, 2005.
 Ann Charters (ed.). The Portable Beat Reader. Penguin Books. New York. 1992.  (hc);  (pbk)

External links

Obituary by Christopher Lehmann-Haupt in The New York Times, March 21, 2005
 Obituary by Marcus Williamson in The Independent (UK), March 15, 2005
 Obituary by Jesse Hamlin in the San Francisco Chronicle, March 11, 2005
 Guide to the Philip Lamantia Papers at The Bancroft Library
 Philip Lamantia's Last Interview
 Biographic-appreciation of Lamantia as teacher
  Essay on poems to or about Lamantia by 11 different poets: Robert Duncan (poet), Michael McClure, Lisa Jarnot, Will Alexander (poet), Clark Coolidge, Ramson Lomatewama, John Olson (poet and writer), Penelope Rosemont, Donald Sidney-Fryer, Garrett Caples, and Eileen Tabios
 On Lamantia's first national publication in View, June 1943
 On Meadowlark West, Lamantia's final full collection of poetry
 On Lamantia's shaped poem 'In a grove'
 An appreciation of The Collected Poems of Philip Lamantia, with two dozen individual poems discussed

1927 births
2005 deaths
Beat Generation poets
Catholics from California
American poets of Italian descent
American male poets
Surrealist poets
American Roman Catholic poets
Writers from San Francisco
20th-century American poets
20th-century American male writers
20th-century American non-fiction writers
American male non-fiction writers